Max von Gerlach (born Max Stork Gerlach; October 12, 1885 – October 18, 1958) was an acquaintance of American writer F. Scott Fitzgerald in New York. Gerlach was an officer in the American Expeditionary Forces during World War I who became a gentleman bootlegger and lived like a millionaire in New York. Flaunting his wealth as a bootlegger, Gerlach threw lavish parties, never wore the same shirt twice, used the phrase "old sport", claimed to be educated at Oxford University, and fostered myths about himself; including that he was a relation of the German Kaiser. These details about Gerlach inspired Fitzgerald in his creation of Jay Gatsby, the titular character of The Great Gatsby.

With the end of prohibition and the onset of the Great Depression, Gerlach lost his immense wealth. Living in reduced circumstances, he attempted suicide by shooting himself in the head in 1939. Blinded after his suicide attempt, he lived as a helpless invalid for many years. Gerlach died on October 18, 1958, at Bellevue Hospital in New York City. He was buried in a pine casket at Long Island National Cemetery.

Biography

Early life and military service 
According to research by scholar Horst Kruse, Gerlach was presumably born in or near Berlin, Germany, in 1885. His father was Ferdinand Gerlach, a secretary to Frederick III in the Ministry of the Royal House of Hohenzollern. His father later died in 1887 or 1888 while serving in Royal Prussian Army. After his father's death, his mother Elizabeth Gerlach remarried to a merchant. In 1894, Max, his mother, and his step-father immigrated to the United States and settled in Yonkers, New York. In 1900, a fifteen-year-old Gerlach worked on a motor boat as a machinist where he traveled to Mexico. He later worked as a mechanic and car salesman in Cuba and other locales. By 1910, a 25-year-old Max had returned to the United States and become a merchant on Second Avenue in Manhattan.

In 1918, following the United States' entrance into World War I, Gerlach applied for a major's commission in the Ordnance Department of the United States Army. Although he applied to be a major, he was commissioned as a first lieutenant and managed military logistics for the American Expeditionary Forces while stationed in Hoboken, New Jersey. After the armistice with Imperial Germany, Gerlach was honorably discharged. Immediately after his discharge, Gerlach began traveling between Cuba and the United States during which time he likely became involved in illegally importing alcohol during Prohibition. He soon became a gentleman bootlegger who lived like a millionaire in New York.

Bootlegging and meeting Fitzgerald 

While Gerlach was involved in bootlegging in New York, he met writer F. Scott Fitzgerald. Both the author's wife Zelda Fitzgerald and his friend Edmund Wilson stated that Max Gerlach was a neighbor. Despite this claim, scholars are uncertain where the two met and have yet to find surviving property records for a Long Island estate with Gerlach's name. However, there are likely "gaps in the record of his addresses", and an accurate reconstruction of Gerlach's life is hindered "by the imperfect state of relevant documentation".

In his interactions with Fitzgerald, Gerlach claimed to have been born in the United States to a German immigrant family. Flaunting his new wealth, Gerlach threw lavish parties, never wore the same shirt twice, used the phrase "old sport", claimed to be educated at Oxford University, and fostered myths about himself, including that he was a relation of the German Kaiser. These details would inspire Fitzgerald in creating his next work, The Great Gatsby.

Loss of wealth and suicide attempt 
In Summer 1927, Gerlach was arrested and charged with violating the Volstead Act by selling alcohol. The outcome of the case is unknown, but he later appeared in records at a prestigious address on 22 East 38th Street. With the end of prohibition and the onset of the Great Depression, Gerlach lost his immense wealth. Living in reduced circumstances, he attempted suicide by shooting himself in the head in 1939. Blinded after his suicide attempt, he lived as a helpless invalid for many years.

Final years and death 
Following the popular success of The Great Gatsby, a blind Gerlach attempted to contact Fitzgerald's first biographer Arthur Mizener in 1951. He attempted to communicate to Mizener that he had partly inspired the character of Jay Gatsby. However, Mizener believed that Jay Gatsby was an entirely fictional character and declined to speak with Gerlach. Gerlach died on October 18, 1958, at Bellevue Hospital in New York City. He was buried in a pine casket at Long Island National Cemetery.

Following Gerlach's death, later Fitzgerald scholars discovered correspondence between Gerlach and Fitzgerald. In one letter, Gerlach had written, "How are you and the family, old sport?" Further claims made by Zelda Sayre Fitzgerald and Fitzgerald's friend Edmund Wilson bolstered the claim that Gerlach had primarily inspired the fictional character, including a statement by Wilson that Fitzgerald had visited Gerlach's home and had been impressed by its splendor. Several years before her death, Zelda stated "that Gatsby was based on 'a neighbor named Von Guerlach or something who was said to be General Pershing's nephew and was in trouble over bootlegging'".

References

Notes

Citations

Works cited 

 
 
 

1885 births
1958 deaths
American gangsters of German descent
Bootleggers
The Great Gatsby
German emigrants to the United States
People from Berlin
United States Army officers
United States Army personnel of World War I
Year of birth unknown